Cryptodaphne kilburni is a species of sea snail, a marine gastropod mollusk in the family Raphitomidae.

Description
The length of the shell attains 6.7 mm.

Distribution
This marine species occurs at bathyal depths in the Gulf of Aden.

References

 Morassi & Bonfitto. 2006. Cryptodaphne kilburni, a new species of bathyal Turridae (Gastropoda: Prosobranchia) from the Gulf of Aden (northwestern Indian Ocean). Veliger    Volume: 48    Issue: 3    Pages: 230-233

External links
 Gastropods.com: Cryptodaphne kilburni

kilburni
Gastropods described in 2006